Kristina Stolpovskaya (born 27 May 1986) is a Kazakhstani former footballer who played as a defender. She has been a member of the Kazakhstan women's national team.

References

1986 births
Living people
Women's association football defenders
Kazakhstani women's footballers
Kazakhstan women's international footballers
BIIK Kazygurt players
CSHVSM-Kairat players